O Fim do Mundo is a Brazilian telenovela produced and displayed at the time of 20 hours by TV Globo, May 6 to June 14, 1996 in 35 chapters.

Written by Dias Gomes with collaboration of Ferreira Gullar, with general direction of Paulo Ubiratan and Gonzaga Blota and core direction of Paulo Ubiratan. He had José Wilker, Paloma Duarte, Maurício Mattar, Paulo Betti, Guilherme Fontes, Vera Holtz, Patrícia França, Marcos Winter, Bruna Lombardi and Lima Duarte in the main roles of the plot.

It was resubmitted between August 15 and September 29, 2000, just for the Distrito Federal, shortly after a presentation of Jornal Nacional, while not the rest of Brazil, was the presentation of free election time.

Production 
Dias Gomes wrote the text to be presented as a miniseries but, because of the number of chapters, 35, and the traditional time at which it was presented at 8 pm, it was released as a mininovel, although it was in practice a miniseries. This was due to the fact that the predecessor novel, Explode Coração, was shortened in 2 months, at the author's own request, and her successor, O Rei do Gado, was not fully prepared.

For the first time in a novel, objects and virtual animals were created on three computer platforms. For the recordings of the cataclysm a model was made, ten times smaller than the scenic city, which had 35 thousand square meters.

Cast

References

External links

O Fim do Mundo no Memória Globo 
O Fim do Mundo no Memória Globo 

1996 Brazilian television series debuts
1996 Brazilian television series endings
1996 telenovelas
TV Globo telenovelas
Brazilian telenovelas
Portuguese-language telenovelas
Apocalyptic television series